Qarah Mohammad (also Romanized as Qarah Moḩammad and Qareh Moḩammad; also known as Ghareh Mohammad, Moḩammadābād, Qarāmadh, and Qarā Moḩammad) is a village in Zarrineh Rud Rural District, Bizineh Rud District, Khodabandeh County, Zanjan Province, Iran. At the 2006 census, its population was 283, in 50 families.

References 

Populated places in Khodabandeh County